The Story of Us is a 2016 Philippine romantic drama television series starring Kim Chiu and Xian Lim. The series premiered on ABS-CBN's Primetime Bida evening block and worldwide via The Filipino Channel from February 29, 2016 to June 17, 2016, replacing On the Wings of Love.

Synopsis
Tin and Macoy are childhood friends turned lovers who grew up together in El Nido, Palawan and dreamed of a better life for them and their family. Circumstances will drive them apart as Tin goes to the United States. Separated from each other, the two are forced to work on their own, driving them further apart until their relationship crumbles.

Cast and characters

Main cast
 Kim Chiu as Cristine "Tin" Manalo
 Alyanna Angeles as young Cristine "Tin"
 Xian Lim as Ferdinand "Macoy" Sandoval, Jr.
 Zaijian Jaranilla as young Ferdinand "Macoy"

Supporting cast
 Shaina Magdayao as Lucia "Cia" Cristobal
 Princess Punzalan as Clodette Lowery
 Zsa Zsa Padilla as Myra Simbulan
 Aiko Melendez as Carmy Santos-Manalo
 Susan Africa as Aurora Sandoval
 Gardo Versoza as Ferdinand "Ferdie" Sandoval, Sr.
 John Arcilla as Danilo "Danny" Manalo
 Janus del Prado as Ruben "Bok" Garcia
 Nikki Valdez as Maritess Garcia
 Nonong "Bangky" de Andres as Eddie Sandoval
 Eric Quizon as Miguel
 Leandro Muñoz as Alex
 Carlo Muñoz as Alvin
 Beth Tamayo as Stella

Guest cast
 Eddie Gutierrez as Luis Cristobal
 Marita Zobel as Martha Cristobal

Ratings

Awards and nominations

See also
 List of programs broadcast by ABS-CBN
 List of ABS-CBN drama series

References

External links
 Official website of The Story of US  on Facebook
 Official website of The Story Of US on Twitter
 

ABS-CBN drama series
Philippine melodrama television series
Philippine romance television series
2016 Philippine television series debuts
2016 Philippine television series endings
Television series by Star Creatives
Television shows filmed in New York City
Television shows filmed in the Philippines
Filipino-language television shows